The following is a list of Michigan State Historic Sites in Shiawassee County, Michigan. Sites marked with a dagger (†) are also listed on the National Register of Historic Places in Shiawassee County, Michigan.


Current listings

See also
 National Register of Historic Places listings in Shiawassee County, Michigan

Sources
 Historic Sites Online – Shiawassee County. Michigan State Housing Developmental Authority. Accessed June 3, 2011.

References

Shiawassee County
State Historic Sites